Latastia  petersiana, also known as  Peters's long-tailed lizard, is a species of lizard endemic to Somalia.

References

Reptiles described in 1938
Latastia
Endemic fauna of Somalia
Reptiles of Somalia
Taxa named by Robert Mertens